Mikhail Ivanovich Prudnikov (Russian: Михаил Иванович Прудников; born 1928) is a Russian coxswain who represented the Soviet Union. He competed at the 1952 Summer Olympics in Helsinki with the men's coxed pair where they were eliminated in the semi-final repêchage.

References

External links
 

1928 births
Possibly living people
Soviet male rowers
Olympic rowers of the Soviet Union
Rowers at the 1952 Summer Olympics
Sportspeople from Altai Krai
Coxswains (rowing)